The Shire of Eacham was a local government area of Queensland. It was located on the Atherton Tableland, a plateau forming part of the Great Dividing Range west of the city of Cairns.

Despite its tropical latitude, the high altitude on the tableland allows a dairy industry to operate.

History
On 22 Nov 1910 the area around Lake Eacham was incorporated as the Shire of Eacham, taking in part of each of the Shires of Tinaroo, Johnstone and Cairns.

Its first meeting was held at Yungaburra's community hall on 22 February 1911. In April 1912, a site for a shire hall was reserved in Malanda. On 12 April 1913, the shire relocated its offices to Malanda. However, the planned council chambers did not open until 22 Feb 1939.

Around 1920, the shire council began an active role in developing the Malanda Falls into the (now heritage-listed) Malanda Falls Swimming Pool and associated infrastructure, initially for local recreation but then increasingly to attract tourists to the area via Cairns.

On 15 March 2008, under the Local Government (Reform Implementation) Act 2007 passed by the Parliament of Queensland on 10 August 2007, the Shire of Eacham merged with the Shires of Atherton, Herberton and Mareeba to form the Tablelands Region.

Towns and localities
The Shire of Eacham included the following settlements:

 Malanda
 Yungaburra
 Butchers Creek
 Glen Allyn
 Jaggan
 Lake Eacham
 Maalan
 Millaa Millaa
 North Johnstone
 Palmerston1
 Peeramon
 Tarzali
 Upper Barron2

1 - shared with Cassowary Coast Region
2 - split with the former Shire of Atherton

Population

Chairmen and mayors
 1927: R. E. McHugh 
 1988-2000: Philip English
 2000-2004: Mary Lyle
 2004-2008: Ray Byrnes

References

External links
 University of Queensland: Queensland Places: Eacham Shire
 

Former local government areas of Queensland
Far North Queensland
2008 disestablishments in Australia
Populated places disestablished in 2008